Quinn and Rose is a syndicated conservative talk radio program hosted by Jim Quinn and Rose Somma Tennent. Broadcasting from Pittsburgh, Pennsylvania, the show currently airs in limited syndication from flagship station WPGB-HD2/WBGG in Pittsburgh during the morning drive time slot.

Prior to 2013, the program aired on WPGB's main channel as its morning drive show and was syndicated to several affiliates, mostly in the northeastern United States. The series was abruptly canceled after the November 15, 2013 broadcast, with Clear Channel citing an inability to reach a contract extension, later suggestions indicating that Clear Channel budget cuts were at fault, and the show's affiliates claiming the duo was fired. (The contract dispute appears to pertain directly to Quinn, as Rose remained a fill-in host for Clear Channel as of January 2014.) Flagship station WPGB changed formats nine months after Quinn's firing; there has been speculation that WJAS, which picked up most of WPGB's lineup, would revive the program. A major hangup in negotiations was that Quinn insists on retaining all rights to the Internet stream. Quinn would eventually return to radio, but without Rose, in March 2015. Rose, in turn, would pick up her own show on WPGP (AM 1250), in late May of the same year. Both Quinn's and Rose's programs were carried by WYSL.

In September 2018, Quinn and Rose agreed to reunite on WBGG, which otherwise operates as a sports talk station. Quinn's existing program, carried on WYSL, will continue. WBGG's Web site makes no mention of airing the program. In March 2021, Rose left to take over Rush Limbaugh's time slot on WJAS following Limbaugh's death.

The program was designed to appeal to political conservatives. Quinn denigrates liberals, the IRS, big government, radical environmentalists, the bias of the mainstream media, and outspoken Hollywood actors. He promotes issues such as the right to bear arms, the FairTax, Christian values, alternative media, and the military. Issues Quinn discusses from a conservative point of view include U.S. domestic politics, world affairs, science, economics, and social issues. Rose predominantly takes stances on issues concerning her spiritual faith with regards to politics, religion, family values, social problems, and education.

"Heads-Up" themes
The show has a unique format in that it is, for the most part, divided into thematic "Heads-Ups" (e.g. Liberal Heads-Up, "Euro-weenie" Heads-Up, ACLU Heads-Up), each with its own theme song:

Education/University Heads-up: "Another Brick in the Wall" by Pink Floyd
ACLU Heads-Up: "Losing My Religion" by R.E.M.
Gay Heads-Up: "YMCA" by The Village People
Immigration Heads-Up: "Illegal Alien" by Genesis
Liberal Heads-Up: "Love Me, I'm a Liberal" by Jello Biafra and Mojo Nixon
Media Heads-Up: "Dirty Laundry" by Don Henley
Clinton Legacy Heads-Up: "Here's a Quarter (Call Someone Who Cares)" by Travis Tritt
Hillary Clinton Heads-Up: "How Can I Miss You When You Won't Go Away?" by Dan Hicks (singer)
Racial Heads-Up: "Black or White" by Michael Jackson
Union Heads-Up: "Bang on The Drum All Day" by Todd Rundgren
Gun Heads-Up: "Lock and Load" by Bob Seger
School Heads-Up: "School Days" by Chuck Berry
Ted Kennedy Heads-Up: "Drive My Car" by The Beatles
Victim Heads-Up: "Get Over It" by Eagles
Insane Item of the Day, "Moonbat" Heads-Up: "They're Coming to Take Me Away" by Napoleon XIV
Harry Reid Heads-Up: "Pinky and the Brain" theme
John Kerry Heads-Up: "Flipper" Theme
Bush Heads-Up: "Bush Was Right" by The Right Brothers
Iran Heads-Up: "Bomb Iran" by Vince Vance & The Valiants
Iraq Heads-Up: "I'm Free" by The Who
Hate mail: "Everything About You" by Ugly Kid Joe
France Heads-Up: "Surrender to Love" by Kindred the Family Soul
San Francisco Heads-Up: "San Francisco" by Scott McKenzie
Democrat Heads-Up: "Surrender to Love" by Kindred the Family Soul/"It's My Party and I'll Cry If I Want To" by Lesley Gore
America Heads-Up: "Living in America" by James Brown
Animal rights Heads-Up: "Wabbit Slayer" by Ozzy Fudd
Government Heads-Up: "For What It's Worth" by Buffalo Springfield
Euro-Weenie Heads-Up: "Springtime for Hitler" from The Producers soundtrack
Greeny-Weenie Heads-Up: "Bein' Green" by Kermit the Frog
New World Order Heads-Up: "Bidding America Goodbye (The Auction)" by Tanya Tucker
Peacenik/Cindy Sheehan Heads-Up: "I'd Like to Teach the World to Sing" by The New Seekers
Sexual harassment Heads-Up: "He Touched Me" by Barbra Streisand
Venezuela Heads-Up: "Hot Hot Hot" by Buster Poindexter
Death penalty Heads-Up: "Shock The Monkey" by Peter Gabriel
Barack Obama Heads-Up: "Bad Company" by Bad Company, "Who Are You" by The Who or "I Wanna Talk About Me" by Toby Keith
Welfare Heads-up: "Free Ride" by Edgar Winter
Sarah Palin Heads-up: "I'm a Woman" by Peggy Lee
Scott Brown Heads-up: "Pickup Man" by Joe Diffie
Michigan Heads-up:  "Foolish Pride" by Travis Tritt
Ozone Al Heads-Up: "Lost In The Ozone" by Commander Cody and his Lost Planet Airmen
Dzhokhar Tsarnaev Heads-up: "Come on Down to My Boat" by Every Mother's Son
The usual bumper music is "Monster" by Steppenwolf, "Eminence Front" by The Who, "Stranglehold" by Ted Nugent, "Cradle Will Rock" by Van Halen, "La Grange" by ZZ Top, "Soul Shaker", "Save a Horse (Ride a Cowboy)" by Big and Rich, and "Panama" by Van Halen, American Radio by Carolina Rain and (on Fridays at the top of the hour) "Working for the Weekend" by Loverboy.

Affiliates
Starting in Pittsburgh, the show was syndicated mainly through the eastern United States. At its peak the show had eighteen affiliates, many of which paired the show with Clear Channel's existing conservative talk network (which does not have a morning drive program of its own). Most affiliates replaced the show with local programming, while other FM affiliates went to music formats. The show originated from WPGB.

The show was carried on XM Satellite Radio via "America's Talk" with the last show being carried on October 17, 2013, when Clear Channel pulled its programming off the XM platform.

 - Show is streamed via the internet.

References

External links 
Official website

Conservative talk radio
Radio programs on XM Satellite Radio